Petrus Katich or Petrus Catich (1563–1622) was a Roman Catholic prelate who served as Bishop of Prizren (1618–1622).

Biography
Petrus Katich was born in Sibenico (now Šibenik, Croatia) in 1563.
On 12 Feb 1618, he was appointed during the papacy of Pope Paul V as Bishop of Prizren.
On 24 Feb 1618, he was consecrated bishop by Giovanni Garzia Mellini, Cardinal-Priest of Santi Quattro Coronati, with Marinus Bizzius (Bici), Archbishop of Bar, and Gavino Manca de Cedrelles, Archbishop of Sassari, 
serving as co-consecrators. 
He served as Bishop of Prizren until his death in Mar 1622.

References

External links and additional sources
 (for Chronology of Bishops) 
 (for Chronology of Bishops) 

17th-century Roman Catholic bishops in the Holy Roman Empire
Bishops appointed by Pope Paul V
1563 births
1622 deaths